Phillip Louis Maton III (born March 25, 1993) is an American professional baseball pitcher for the Houston Astros of Major League Baseball (MLB). He played college baseball at Louisiana Tech University. Maton was drafted by the San Diego Padres in the 20th round of the 2015 MLB draft. He made his MLB debut in 2017. He previously played for the Padres and Cleveland Indians.

Amateur career
Maton attended Glenwood High School in Chatham, Illinois, and Louisiana Tech University, where he played college baseball for the Louisiana Tech Bulldogs.

Professional career

Minor leagues
Maton was drafted by the San Diego Padres in the 20th round of the 2015 Major League Baseball draft. He made his professional debut that year with the Short Season-A Tri-City Dust Devils. In 23 relief appearances, Maton pitched to a 4–2 win–loss record, 1.38 earned run average (ERA), and 58 strikeouts in 32 innings pitched. In 2016, Maton pitched for the Class-A Fort Wayne TinCaps, Advanced-A Lake Elsinore Storm, and Triple-A El Paso Chihuahuas. He made a total of 38 appearances for the three teams, and posted a 5–3 record, 1.74 ERA, and 78 strikeouts in 51 innings. After the season, he played in the Arizona Fall League for the Peoria Javelinas. Maton began the 2017 season with Triple-A El Paso.

San Diego Padres

On June 11, 2017, Maton was called up by the Padres after Jake Esch was designated for assignment.  Maton remained with the big league club for the rest of the season, pitching in a middle relief role.  He finished the season with a 4.19 ERA and 46 strikeouts in 43 innings over 46 games.

Maton started 2018 with Triple-A El Paso, but was quickly recalled to the majors when Wil Myers went to the disabled list on April 4.  On May 13, Maton went to the DL with a strained lat and returned to the team on June 21 after a rehab assignment.  He was quickly optioned to Triple-A on June 24, but recalled again on July 9 after posting a sub-1.00 WHIP in six appearances in El Paso.  Maton stayed with the Padres for the remainder of the year, again pitching in middle relief.  For the season, he had a 4.37 ERA and 55 strikeouts in 47 innings.  Maton's walk rate rose in 2018, and he was less effective after returning from his injury, posting a 0.56 ERA in his 16 innings before going on the DL and a 6.32 ERA with the Padres afterwards.

Cleveland Indians

On July 12, 2019, Maton was traded to the Cleveland Indians in exchange for international bonus pool allotments.   In Maton's subsequent 9 games with Cleveland, he posted a 2.92 ERA in 12 innings.

With the Indians, Maton appeared in 23 games, compiling a 3–3 record with 4.57 ERA and 32 strikeouts in 21.2 innings pitched.

Houston Astros

2021
On July 30, 2021, Maton was traded to the Houston Astros along with minor league catcher Yainer Díaz in exchange for outfielder Myles Straw. With Houston in 2021, Maton was 4–0 with a 4.97 ERA. In 27 games, he pitched  innings.

2022
Maton avoided arbitration with the Astros on March 22, 2022, agreeing to a $1.55 million contract for the season.

On June 15, 2022, Maton threw an immaculate inning in the seventh inning versus the Texas Rangers at Globe Life Field, striking out Nathaniel Lowe, Ezequiel Durán, and Brad Miller.  In the second inning, teammate Luis Garcia had also struck out the same three batters for an immaculate inning, making this the first occasion in major league history of two immaculate innings pitched in a single game, on the same date.  Maton's immaculate inning was the ninth in team history.  In the 2022 season final on October 5, Maton faced his younger brother, Nick, in the major leagues for the first time, yielding a single. After the game, Maton punched a locker, which resulted in a fractured fifth metacarpal area on his right hand. He underwent surgery a day later and was ruled out for the playoffs.

2023
On January 13, 2023, Maton signed a one-year, $2.55 million contract with the Astros, avoiding salary arbitration.

Personal life
Maton’s two younger brothers also play baseball. Nick is a shortstop for the Detroit Tigers and Jacob is a pitcher who was drafted by the Mariners in 2018, but opted to play college baseball at Coastal Carolina.

Maton is married to Katelynn Cook.

See also

 List of Louisiana Tech University people
 List of Major League Baseball pitchers who have thrown an immaculate inning

References

External links

Louisiana Tech Bulldogs bio – archived March 5, 2017

1993 births
Living people
Sportspeople from Paducah, Kentucky
Baseball players from Kentucky
Major League Baseball pitchers
San Diego Padres players
Cleveland Indians players
Houston Astros players
Louisiana Tech Bulldogs baseball players
Tri-City Dust Devils players
Fort Wayne TinCaps players
Lake Elsinore Storm players
El Paso Chihuahuas players
Columbus Clippers players
Peoria Javelinas players